Eight Prohibitions(범금팔조), also called Paljojigyo(팔조지교) or Paljobeop(팔조법) is a criminal law. When people from the Shang dynasty migrated to the Korean peninsula and established Gija Joseon, the sage politician Jizi from the Shang dynasty enacted this law to educate and strengthen the Korean people. This law was made up of eight prohibitions regarding etiquette, agriculture, rice farming, sericulture and weaving.

Contents 
Although not all of the 8 prohibitions are known, the known part is as follows.

Those who commit murder shall be put to death immediately.
Those who cause injury must compensate with grain.
Those who steal will be enslaved or pay recompense.

Notes

References

External links 
 

Gija Joseon
Korean law
Politics of Korea
Legal codes